Powell's Creek is a tributary of the James River on the south side of the James River in Prince George County, Virginia,  United  States. The creek borders James River National Wildlife Refuge near Garysville, Virginia.

History 
In 1730, a tobacco inspection site was located here. According to the Tobacco Inspection Act, the inspection was "In Prince George; at Appamatox Point, upon Col. Bolling's land; on Col. Robert Mumford's land; and Powel's Creek; upon Mr. Bland's land, under one inspection."

According to a State of Virginia historical marker, "The creek ... was named for Nathaniel Powell, acting governor in 1619. Weyanoke Indian town was here. Nearby was the site of an old mill, known in the Revolution as Bland's, and later, Cocke's Mill. The British General Phillips passed here May, 1781. Here Grant's army, after crossing the James, turned towards Petersburg, June, 1864."

References

Rivers of Virginia
Bland family of Virginia
Tributaries of the James River
Rivers of Prince George County, Virginia